Community College of Allegheny County (CCAC) is a public community college in Allegheny County, Pennsylvania. With four campuses and four centers, the college offers associate degrees, certificates, and diplomas.

History
The Pennsylvania legislature passed the Community College Act in 1963 and officials in Allegheny County began the process of creating a local community college. Residents of the county voted in favor of funding the project in May 1965 and the first 15-member Board of Trustees was sworn in that December. The college opened Boyce Campus, in Monroeville, and Allegheny Campus, on Pittsburgh's North Side, in 1966. The following year, South Campus was opened; North Campus opened in 1972. The college also has centers, beyond the main campuses, that offer classes.

Academics
CCAC's academic programs lead to an associate degree, a certificate, or transfer to a four-year institution through more than 150 programs, as well as lifelong learning, community education, continuing education and workforce training courses. During the 2012-2013 academic year, it had more than 32,000 credit and 28,000 non-credit students. Through articulation agreements, students are guaranteed admission, and the recognition of courses, at a number of institutions offering four-year degrees. Mechatronics, CCAC’s signature automation systems program, was endorsed by the ARM Institute in September 2021.

Student life and athletics
Volunteer students operate a college-wide newspaper, The Voice. The newspaper and its staff have received several recognitions and awards in recent years, including Keystone Student Press Awards from the Pennsylvania NewsMedia Association and the Associated Collegiate Press. In Spring 2020, The Voice was recognized as one of the few community college student newspapers to continue to publish regularly during the COVID-19 pandemic.

CCAC athletics are affiliated with the National Junior College Athletic Association (NJCAA). The team name and mascot, Wild Cats, was chosen by a student vote in 2019. Intercollegiate sports include men's and women's basketball, women's volleyball, men's baseball, men's and women's golf and bowling.

Campuses
The Community College of Allegheny County has a campus or center within ten miles (16 km) of more than 95% of Allegheny County residents.

Allegheny Campus

In Pittsburgh's Allegheny West neighborhood and surrounded by Heinz Field, PNC Park, the Carnegie Science Center, and other notable landmarks, CCAC's Allegheny Campus is the largest and only urban campus of the college.

The centerpiece of the campus is the Student Services center, a  hub housing the enrollment and financial aid offices, classrooms, a student lounge, dining facilities and a 300-seat theatre/auditorium.

The campus also features a library, physical education facilities and Milton Hall, the main campus classroom building. Along scenic Ridge Avenue and Galveston Street are the following: West Hall, Jones Hall, the general administration building; Byers Hall, housing the offices of the President; and the Visual Arts Center. 
In March 2013, the K. Leroy Irvis Science Center was dedicated. The 65,000-square foot building was constructed using green building technology, earning the highly coveted LEED Silver Energy rating. The building supports the course work in Biotechnology, Biology, Microbiology, Anatomy and Physiology, Chemistry, Organic Chemistry, Physics, Geology, Astronomy and Physical Science.

Boyce Campus

The Boyce Campus, named after William D. Boyce who founded the Boy Scouts of America, is on a  plot in suburban Monroeville, Pennsylvania and can be accessed by the Pennsylvania Turnpike and Routes 48 and Business 22. Adjacent to Boyce Park, the single-building campus features a park-like setting and commanding views of the countryside.

The first of the four campuses to officially commence classes on September 19, 1966, Boyce moved to its current location in time for the start of fall classes in 1969. With all of its programs under one roof, the multi-purpose building houses a gymnasium, cafeteria, theater, library, medical instruction facilities and a child development center. Boyce also provides the community, students, faculty and staff with parking, an exercise room, an outdoor fitness trail and baseball and soccer fields. A Pennsylvania State Historical Marker in the parking lot recognizes Boyce's contributions to Scouting.

North Campus

CCAC's North Campus, located in suburban McCandless Township, Pennsylvania, was established in 1972 and is housed in a 150,000-square-foot (14,000 m2), single-building campus. Located approximately 12 miles (19 km) north of downtown Pittsburgh, the campus draws more than 38,000 students from Pittsburgh's northern and western suburbs every year. North Campus offers academic, workforce development and continuing education programs and classes.

North Campus offers more than 55 different certificate and associate degrees, including Accounting and Business Management, Child Development, Computer & Information Science, Criminal Justice & Criminology, Land Administration, Tourism Management, Social Work, Nursing, and American Sign Language & Interpreting programs of study.

South Campus

In suburban West Mifflin, CCAC's South Campus serves Allegheny County's southern communities and the Mon Valley region. The campus is located off of Route 885 not far from Century III Mall and is easily accessed by routes 51 and 43 (the Mon Valley Expressway) and by public transportation.

The campus moved to its current six-story, comprehensive education facility in 1973. Its five buildings are connected by indoor walkways and house lecture halls, classrooms, a learning assistance center, a community library, a theater, a radio station, dining areas and office space. A solar-heated greenhouse is adjacent to the campus complex and provides botanical accents for picturesque outdoor walkways and trails. South Campus' recently expanded Learning Resource center includes computer and media centers and allied health and nursing laboratories. The campus also features a new Community Education center building containing continuing education offices, a gymnasium and a fully equipped fitness center, and the United States Steel Business and Industry center.

Centers
CCAC has four centers in Allegheny and Washington counties.

Braddock Hills Center
Replacing the former CCAC Braddock and Turtle Creek centers, the Braddock Hills center is in the Braddock Hills Shopping Center.

The instruction facility contains six classrooms, three computer labs, videoconferencing facilities and a health careers program laboratory. The center offers degree and certificate programs, community education, and customized workforce job training for corporations and businesses.

Homewood-Brushton Center
Situated on North Homewood Avenue, the Homewood-Brushton center is positioned to serve the city's east-end neighborhoods and outlying suburbs. A community presence since 1967, the center's current building dates from 1981, when popularity of the center's programs necessitated the construction of a new  facility. The center houses classrooms, including a Learning Resource center, reading, computer, anatomy, chemistry and biology laboratories and videoconferencing facilities.

The center offers a range of credit, non-credit and special programming year-round and hosts four active clubs, an after-school homework clinic, a math, science and computer institute conducted during the summer for kindergarten and grade-school age children and has established a relationship with the Carnegie Library of Homewood to be the center's library. Numerous community groups use the center as a meeting and gathering place.

Washington County Center
Founded in 2001, the Washington County center is the college's first and only center operating outside of Allegheny County. The center is located in Washington Crown Center mall.

The center affords Washington County residents the ability to take a wide variety of credit, non-credit, community education, workforce training, dual enrollment (earmarked for high school juniors and seniors) and Act 48 training classes at the center and at locations throughout Washington County.

West Hills Center

Opened in spring 2007, CCAC's West Hills center replaces the former Airport West and Technology centers. Located in a  facility in North Fayette Township, the center features spacious, well-lit classrooms, and comprehensive student life services. It also houses high-bay areas for automotive, HVAC, welding and other trade-related programs. The majority of the coursework required to complete the Mechatronics program - a program endorsed by the Advanced Robotics for Manufacturing Institute in September 2021 - is also hosted here.  The West Hills Center also has a book store for students, faculty and staff.

On April 16, 2014, both President Barack Obama and Vice President Joe Biden visited the West Campus.

Notable alumni
Paul Costa, accountant and politician
Anthony M. DeLuca, politician and businessman
Kathy Keller, Christian writer and church founder
Miroslav Škoro, Croatian singer and politician

Presidents
Stewart Sutin

References

External links

Official website
The Voice student newspaper online

Allegheny County, Community College of
Educational institutions established in 1966
Universities and colleges in Allegheny County, Pennsylvania
Universities and colleges in Pittsburgh
1966 establishments in Pennsylvania
NJCAA athletics
Two-year colleges in the United States